{{Infobox comics creator
| image         =
| imagesize     =
| caption       =
| birth_name    =
| birth_date    = 
| birth_place   = Kanagawa, Japan
| death_date    =
| death_place   =
| nationality   = Japanese
| area          = Manga artist
| alias         =
| notable works = Samurai Deeper Kyo, Code:Breaker
| awards        =
| manga         = Yes
| website       =
}}
 is the pen name of a Japanese manga artist. Her works include Samurai Deeper Kyo, Shirogane no Karasu (also known as Silver Crow) which started on May 30, 2007, in Weekly Shōnen Magazine, and her most recent work Code:Breaker, which was completed in 2013. She started Kobayashi Shounen to Futei no Kaijin in 2017, as she planned from November 2016. She has also written doujinshi under the pen name Meika Hatagashira (伯明華).

She worked as Rumiko Takahashi's assistant for two months. Then Haruko Kashiwagi's assistant.

Works
 (1999–2006, serialized in Weekly Shōnen Magazine, Kodansha)
 (2007–2008, serialized in Weekly Shōnen Magazine, Kodansha)
 (2008-2013, serialized in Weekly Shōnen Magazine'', Kodansha)

References

External links

Living people
Manga artists from Kanagawa Prefecture
1975 births